Kanpur Municipal Corporation is a municipal corporation of Kanpur city in Indian state of Uttar Pradesh. The corporation has 110 wards covering area equal to 403 square kilometres.

History

The municipality in Kanpur, then Cawnpore was first established on 22 November 1861 under the chairmanship of a District Magistrate. Lala Sheo Prasad was the first Vice Chairman of the association of Cawnpore Municipal Committee. The Town Hall building was erected at Cooperganj in the year 1879 with investment of around 2,16,000 rupees.

The first drainage system was established in 1872 and the first protected water supply in 1892. The city became a municipal corporation in 1959. Ram Ratan Gupta became the first mayor of Kanpur.

Elections

See List of mayors of Kanpur

See also
Kanpur (Mayoral Constituency)

References

External links
 

Municipal corporations in Uttar Pradesh
1959 establishments in Uttar Pradesh
Government of Kanpur